Paul Cain may refer to:
Paul Cain (minister) (1929–2019), Pentecostal Christian minister
Paul Cain (author) (1902–1966), American author of pulp fiction

See also
Paul Kane (disambiguation)